Horsunlu is a small town in the District of Kuyucak, Aydın Province, Turkey. As of 2010 it had a population of 2593 people.

References 

Villages in Kuyucak District